Rewind – The Best of Diesel (styled as bniwer the best of diesel with "rewind" in mirror writing) is a greatest hits album by Australian rock musician, Diesel (a.k.a. Johnny Diesel, Mark Lizotte) who previously fronted Johnny Diesel & the Injectors. The album was released in October 1996 via EMI.

It includes tracks from four albums: Johnny Diesel and The Injectors (1989), Hepfidelity (1992), The Lobbyist (1993) and Solid State Rhyme (1994). It was issued in the United States on 25 May 2003.

Track listing

Note: Tracks 13 to 16 were originally by Johnny Diesel & The Injectors, but are not credited as such on this release.

Certifications

References

External links 
 

Diesel (musician) albums
1996 compilation albums
Chrysalis Records albums
EMI Records albums
Compilation albums by Australian artists